Manuel Esparza (born 3 December 1951) is a former Spanish racing cyclist. He rode in eleven Grand Tours between 1974 and 1980.

References

External links
 

1951 births
Living people
Spanish male cyclists
Sportspeople from Sabadell
Cyclists from Catalonia
20th-century Spanish people